No Ordinary Time: Franklin and Eleanor Roosevelt: The Home Front in World War II is a historical, biographical book by American author and presidential historian Doris Kearns Goodwin published by Simon & Schuster in 1994.

Based on interviews with 86 people who knew them personally, the book chronicles the lives of President Franklin D. Roosevelt and First Lady Eleanor Roosevelt, focusing particularly on the period between May 10, 1940 (the end of the so-called "Phoney War" stage of World War II) and President Roosevelt's death on April 12, 1945. The title is taken from the speech Eleanor Roosevelt gave at the 1940 Democratic National Convention in hopes of unifying the, at the time, divided Democratic party.

No Ordinary Time was awarded the 1995 Pulitzer Prize for History.

Alan J. Pakula was working on a screenplay based upon the book at the time of his death in 1998.

References

External links
Review by Christopher Lehmann-Haupt, September 19, 1994
Booknotes interview with Goodwin on No Ordinary Time, January 1, 1995.

1995 non-fiction books
20th-century history books
Books by Doris Kearns Goodwin
History books about the United States
Pulitzer Prize for History-winning works
Books about Franklin D. Roosevelt
United States home front during World War II
Simon & Schuster books